Miguel Valle (born 29 September 1968) is a retired Cuban decathlete.

He won the gold medal at the 1986 Central American and Caribbean Junior Championships (in a new games record), the gold medal at the 1986 Pan American Junior Championships, the gold medal at the 1987 Central American and Caribbean Championships (as well as the bronze medal in the long jump), the gold medal at the 1990 Central American and Caribbean Games, finished sixth at the 1991 Pan American Games, and won the silver medal at the 1994 Ibero-American Championships. He also became Cuban champion.

References

1968 births
Living people
Cuban decathletes
Cuban male long jumpers
Central American and Caribbean Games gold medalists for Cuba
Pan American Games competitors for Cuba
Athletes (track and field) at the 1991 Pan American Games
Central American and Caribbean Games medalists in athletics
Competitors at the 1990 Central American and Caribbean Games